Scrabster is a small settlement on Thurso Bay in Caithness on the north coast of Scotland. Scrabster Harbour is an important port for the Scottish fishing industry.

During the Second World War, munitions were ferried to Scapa Flow from Scrabster harbour aboard the 40 ft (12.2 m) pilot cutter Mermaid (registered in King's Lynn and built in 1908), skippered by Antony Bridges.

Transport
The Northlink ferry leaves regularly from Scrabster for Stromness in Orkney.  Smyril Line operated a weekly service to the Faroe Islands in the summer months, but this was discontinued in 2008.  The nearest railway line is the Far North Line connecting Thurso railway station to Inverness railway station.

Notable people
 George Bain, who led the revivification of Celtic Art.

References

External links

 Scrabster Harbour Trust
 

Populated places in Caithness
Fishing communities in Scotland
Enterprise areas of Scotland
Thurso